Several ships of the French Navy have borne the name Cléopâtre in honour of Cleopatra, pharaoh of Egypt:

 , a 32-gun 
 , a 40-gun 
 , a 52-gun 

French Navy ship names